Cikháj is a municipality and village in Žďár nad Sázavou District in the Vysočina Region of the Czech Republic. It has about 100 inhabitants.

Etymology
The name has its origin probably in the Czech word žíhání that once meant "slash-and-burn". The German name Ziegenhain was derived from the Czech name, meaning "goat grove". The name Cikháj was then created by transliterating the German name back into Czech.

References

Villages in Žďár nad Sázavou District